Choi Yoo-jung (born November 12, 1999), known mononymously as Yoojung, is a South Korean singer, dancer, rapper and actress signed under Fantagio. She debuted as member of I.O.I in May 2016 after achieving third place in the 2016 survival program Produce 101. In January 2017, I.O.I officially disbanded after eleven months of promotion. Following disbandment, she returned to her respective agency and eventually debuted with Weki Meki in August 2017. Choi debuted as a solo artist with the single album Sunflower in September 2022.

Early life and education 
Choi Yoo-jung was born in Guri, Gyeonggi Province, South Korea on November 12, 1999. When she was younger, she wanted to become either a teacher or police officer but started to take an interest in performing. She joined Fantagio and trained for four years and seven months under the company before joining Mnet's girl group survival show Produce 101 in 2016 wherein she ended up debuting as a member of I.O.I. She attended Guri Girls' High School but eventually transferred to School of Performing Arts Seoul along with fellow I.O.I and Weki Meki member Kim Do-yeon after debuting due to their promotional activities.

Career

2016: Produce 101 and I.O.I

In January 2016, Choi joined Produce 101 along with Kim Do-yeon and three other Fantagio trainees with the hopes of debuting in an eleven-member girl group which would promote for a year under YMC Entertainment. Choi initially gained popularity for being chosen by vote as the center for the show's theme song "Pick Me", which had its music video premiere a month before the first show aired on the December 17, 2015 episode of M Countdown. Both Choi and Kim rose to high ranks during the program and eventually placed 3rd and 8th respectively in the show's finale on April 1, 2016, which allowed them to debut as members of I.O.I. On May 4, 2016, I.O.I released their debut single "Dream Girls" which had its rap parts penned by Choi and Im Na-young. Both members also wrote the lyrics for the EP's intro track "I.O.I". The group also promoted as a seven-member unit which Choi was also a part of with Kim, releasing the single "Whatta Man" on August 9, 2016. As part of I.O.I, Choi also released an OST with the unit and also collaborated with fellow members Chungha, Jeon Somi and fellow Produce 101 contestant Ki Hui-hyeon for the digital single "Flower, Wind and You". The song charted at number 42 on the Gaon Digital Chart. She also appeared in the music video of her label-mate ASTRO's song "Breathless" which was released on July 1, 2016. In November 2016, Choi joined the cast of Mnet's music variety show Golden Tambourine. She then released the single "Rise and Fall" together with Yoo Se-yoon, Shim Hyung-tak and Jo Kwon as part of the show's official soundtrack.

2017–2019: Debut with Weki Meki and WJMK

After I.O.I parted ways on January 29, 2017, and ended their contract with YMC Entertainment, Choi and Kim Do-yeon filmed a reality show in the United States titled Dodaeng's Diary in LA which aired on TVING. Months later, Fantagio announced their plans to debut a new girl group, which they later revealed would be called Weki Meki. Both Choi and Kim made their official debut with the group on August 8, 2017, with the release of the single "I Don't Like Your Girlfriend" and the six-track EP Weme which had some of its lyrics written by Choi.

On May 2, 2018, Starship Entertainment and Fantagio revealed their plans to form a special four-member unit with members of their respective girl groups Cosmic Girls and Weki Meki, which they eventually revealed will be called WJMK. Weki Meki's Choi and Kim and Cosmic Girls' Seola and Luda released the single "Strong" on June 1, 2018, along with its accompanying music video. On August 8, she joined the JTBC reality program Secret Unnie with EXID's Hani.

Choi was part of My Mad Beauty 3 alongside Park Na-rae, Mijoo and Han Hye-jin. She was also part of the variety show The Gashinas. In September 2019, Choi participated in the survival program show, V-1, to select the Vocal Queen among the various girl group members, where only the top twelve girl group members in votes would progress and perform on the show. However, she was eliminated in the first episode, after losing out to bandmate Suyeon.

2020–present: Acting career and solo debut
In 2020, Choi starred in the web drama Cast: The Golden Age of Insiders. Later that year, she starred in the web drama Single and Ready to Mingle alongside Kim Doyeon. On May 4, 2021, Choi and the members of I.O.I celebrated their fifth debut anniversary with a reunion live stream show titled "Yes, I Love It!". On September 17, Choi featured on Dotoli's "With a Summer Night". On October 11, Choi featured on Raiden's song "It Wasn't Me" from his debut extended play Love Right Back. On January 17, 2022, Choi featured on Jinjin's "Lazy" from Jinjin & Rocky's debut EP Restore. On August 13, 2022, Choi released the digital single "Uh-ra?" along with rapper Ahn Byung-woong.

On August 23, it was reported that Choi would make her solo debut in September. On August 26, it was confirmed that her debut single album Sunflower will be released on September 14, 2022.

Discography

Single albums

Singles

Filmography

Television series

Television shows

Music videos

Songwriting credits
All song credits are adapted from the Korea Music Copyright Association's database, unless otherwise noted.

Notes

References

External links 

 Choi Yoo-jung at Fantagio 

1999 births
Living people
People from Guri
South Korean female idols
South Korean women pop singers
South Korean television actresses
Swing Entertainment artists
Produce 101 contestants
I.O.I members
21st-century South Korean women singers
21st-century South Korean singers
School of Performing Arts Seoul alumni
21st-century South Korean actresses
Weki Meki
Fantagio artists